Rosalba inscripta is a species of beetle in the family Cerambycidae. It was described by Bates in 1866. It is known from northern South America.

References

Rosalba (beetle)
Beetles described in 1866